Timothy Clare Headington (born 1950) is an American billionaire, the CEO and owner of Headington Oil, a film producer, and real estate developer.

Early life
Timothy Clare Headington is the son of a geologist father, Clare W. Headington, and Catherine Meyer Headington. He has a brother, Gregory Headington, and a sister, Jeanette Kern. In 2013, his brother Gregory married Carrie Christine Boren, daughter of David Boren, the 21st governor of Oklahoma.

Headington attended the University of Oklahoma on a tennis scholarship and graduated with a bachelor of arts degree in history.  He received graduate degrees in theology and psychology from Fuller Theological Seminary in Pasadena, California, and completed his psychology residency at LA County Hospital.

He has received an honorary doctorate from his alma mater.

Career
Oil Industry

Inspired by his geologist father and uncle, Headington founded Headington Oil In 1978, an oil and gas producer based in Oklahoma City. In 1984, he moved his company to Dallas.

Headington is currently president and sole shareholder of Headington Resources, Inc. a Dallas-headquartered company. The company is concentrated primarily in oil and natural gas, real estate/hotel development, film production, private equity and entertainment.  Headington is an active philanthropist, personally and through various family foundations.

Headington stayed under the radar until 2008 when he sold acreage in North Dakota's Bakken oil play to XTO Energy for $1.85 billion.

Entertainment

Headington was invested in GK Films with British Academy Award-winning producer Graham King from 2007 until 2012. He subsequently formed two production companies, Tango Entertainment and Ley Line Entertainment.

As a film producer/executive producer, Headington has worked on numerous projects including Hugo (co-producer) and World War Z (EP credit).

Headington produced Angelina Jolie's feature directorial debut, In the Land of Blood and Honey. The movie won the Stanley Kramer for “(an) achievement or contribution (that) illuminates provocative social issues in an accessible and elevating fashion.” He was an executive producer on Gore Verbinski's animated film Rango.

Other productions include The Young Victoria, The Tourist, Edge of Darkness, The Rum Diary, and the TV miniseries Camelot.

In 2013, Headington partnered with grammy award winning music producer Max Martin to produce the musical "&Juliet." The play premiered in London at the Shaftesbury theater in November 2019. It received nine Olivier Award nominations in 2020, winning three.

Real Estate

Headington developed a hotel in downtown Dallas, The Joule - a member of the Leading Hotels of the World. The Joule is a landmark historical building that has been transformed into a boutique hotel by renowned architect and designer Adam Tihany.

Headington recently completed the renovation of the former Republic National Bank building, now transformed into the Drakestone, a 20 floor apartment building on Main St.

Headington has been acknowledged as a leader in the revitalization of downtown Dallas.

Philanthropy

Headington is co-founder of the nonprofit Headington Institute, headquartered in Pasadena, California.  Its mission is to support first responders and caregivers worldwide who have experienced emotional trauma. Headington remains an active philanthropist through his support of the arts, education and health in his community, including DIFFA/Dallas and the Aging Mind Foundation.

Honors
Headington was an inductee into the Oklahoma Hall of Fame in November 2013.

Personal life
He lives in Dallas, Texas.

Filmography
He was producer for all films unless otherwise noted.

Film

Television

| 2022 || Brian Wilson: Long Promised Road  || Producer
|}

References

External links
 

Living people
1950 births
People from Dallas
University of Oklahoma alumni
Fuller Theological Seminary alumni
Film producers from Texas
American billionaires
American chief executives
American independent film production company founders